for the composer Douglas Hope, see Hilda Wilson

Douglas David Hope (born 6 April 1944 in Erskine, Renfrewshire) is a former Scottish association football referee who refereed over 1,000 matches, the last being the Scottish Cup Final of 1994.

His brother Kenny Hope refereed the 1987 Scottish Cup Final.

References 

Living people
1944 births
Scottish football referees
Sportspeople from Renfrewshire
People from Erskine
Scottish Football League referees